Sebastiano Lo Monaco (1750 – 1800) was an Italian painter active in Sicily during the Rococo period.

Lo Monaco trained under Olivio Sozzi. He frescoed extensively with Matteo Desiderato in the Palazzo Biscari of Catania, including the cupola in the Loggia dei Musici, painted with a Triumph of the Biscari Family. He also frescoed in the Palazzo Reburdone in Catania. He later moved to live in Sortino, where he frescoed the church of the Natività di Maria. Other works of Lo Monaco are found in Lentini, Ragusa, Mineo, Militello in Val di Catania, Siracusa, and Biancavilla.

18th-century Italian painters
Italian male painters
Italian Baroque painters
1750 births
1800 deaths
Painters from Sicily
18th-century Italian male artists